You Are Freaking Me Out is the fifth album from the American band Samiam. Released in 1997 on Burning Heart Records and (the now defunct) Ignition Records.

Track listing

Personnel
Aaron Rubin - bass
James Brogan - guitar
Michael Petrak "MP" - drums
Jason Beebout - vocals
Sergie Loobkoff - guitar

Miscellanea
"She Found You" (Track 2) was made twice into a music video, first in the UK and then, secondly in the USA.
You Are Freaking Me Out was actually completed in 1996 as the follow-up album to Clumsy under contract with Atlantic Records. Nonetheless, Atlantic dropped Samiam from the label and refused to release it. In 1997, Samiam secured the rights to the album and took it to Burning Heart Records for release.

References

1997 albums
Samiam albums
Burning Heart Records albums
Ignition Records albums